is a Japanese footballer currently playing as a full back for Kashiwa Reysol.

Club career
Iwashita was confirmed to have joined J1 League side Kashiwa Reysol ahead of the 2022 season.

Career statistics

Club
.

Notes

References

1999 births
Living people
Toin University of Yokohama alumni
Japanese footballers
Association football defenders
J1 League players
J3 League players
Roasso Kumamoto players
Kashiwa Reysol players